Melipotis decreta is a species of moth in the family Erebidae. It is found in Mexico (Sonora, Veracruz) and Honduras.

References

Moths described in 1858
Melipotis